The 2001–02 World Sevens Series was the third edition of the global circuit for men's national rugby sevens teams, organised by the International Rugby Board. The series ran from November 2001 to May 2002. New Zealand was the series champion for a third consecutive year, and won seven of the eleven tournaments. No other country won more than one tournament during the season. South Africa and England won their first tournaments on the world circuit and finished in second and third place on the final series standings, respectively.

Calendar
Twelve tournaments were originally scheduled for the 2001–02 series but, after several teams withdrew from 2001 Dubai Sevens in the wake of the September 11 attacks that year, the tournament was downgraded in status and excluded from the official series standings.

Final standings
The points awarded to teams at each event, as well as the overall season totals, are shown in the table below. Points for the event winners are indicated in bold. A zero (0) is recorded in the event column where a team played in a tournament but did not gain any points. A dash (–) is recorded in the event column if a team did not compete at a tournament.

Source: rugby7.com (archived)

References

External links

 
World Rugby Sevens Series